Kirk Dodge (born June 4, 1962) is a former American football middle linebacker. He played for the Detroit Lions in 1984, the Houston Oilers in 1986 and for the Denver Broncos in 1987.

References

1962 births
Living people
American football linebackers
UNLV Rebels football players
Detroit Lions players
Houston Oilers players
Denver Broncos players